Club Olympique de Médenine is a Tunisian football club based in Médenine and founded in 1954, currently competing in the Tunisian Ligue Professionnelle 1.

History
Founded on February 5, 1954 under the name of Olympique de Médenine by a Frenchman named Mr. Godal, he played for a long time in regional division before securing his first accession to the second division in 1972, under the direction of Ahmed Msallem even if it retrogrades quickly.

In 1995, the team that was ranked ninth in the third division south, is taken in hand by businessman Bashir Ben Amor. In two years, he allows the club now called the Olympic Club of Medenine to access in  Ligue I. His successor in 2000, Mongi Ksiksi, provided some continuity for the club but the financial means were no longer up to the ambitions and the club found itself again in Ligue III. However, the club regained its ambitions and, in two years, got two accessions that bring him temporarily in Ligue I in 2017, after a play-off against the AS La Marsa.

Achievements & honors
 '''Tunisian Ligue Professionnelle 2: 1997, 2001

Managers

 1971–1973 : Ahmed Msallem
 1973–1975 : Moncef Sallem
 1977–1978 : Ahmed Ouannes
 1978–1979 : Salem Kraïem
 1979–1980 : Abdelkrim Belghaieb / Ahmed Msallem
 1980–1981 : Ahmed Msallem
 1981–1982 : Mohamed Ouni
 1982–1983 : Salem Kraïem
 1983–1984 : Mohamed Ouni / Ouahid Menif
 1984–1985 : Ahmed Lakhdar / Habib Trabelsi
 1985–1986 : Ahmed Ouannes
 1986–1987 : Habib Trabelsi
 1987–1989 : Ivan Gotov
 1989–1990 : Abdelmajid Ben Hmida / Hmida Sallem
 1990–1991 : Mohamed Lassoued
 1991–1992 : Abdelmajid Ben Hmida / Ouahid Menif

 1992–1993 : Fakher Trigui
 1993–1994 : Fakher Trigui / Mohamed Jeriri / Habib Trabelsi
 1994–1995 : Nizar Jebal / Michel Choukodrov / Kamel Boughezala
 1995–1996 : Ferid Laaroussi
 1996–1998 : Mircea Dridea / Hassen Malouche / Stephan Dietscha
 1998–1999 : Robert Buigues / Hédi Kouni /  / Fakher Trigui / Habib Othmani
 1999–2000 : Serge Devèze / Patrice Neveu
 2000–2001 : Kamel Boughezala
 2001–2002 : Patrice Neveu / Kamel Chebli
 2002–2003 : Abderrahmane Rahmouni / Bogdanovic / Ridha Akacha
 2003–2004 : Idrissa Traoré / Larbi Kaddour / Khaled Ben Sassi

 2004–2006 : Hosni Najjari / Kamel Boughezala
 2006–2007 : Chafik Dridi / Hosni Najjari / Tahar Lamine / Mounir Rached
 2007–2008 : Radhouan Lamine / Mounir Rached / Moncef Belhassen
 2008–2009 : Moncef Belhassen, Ahmed Labiedh
 2009–2010 : Walid Atoui / Salah Dey
 2010–2011 : Salah Dey
 2011–2013 : Lotfi Sebti / Tahar Lamine
 2013–2014 : Salah Dey, Nader Werda, Rejeb Sayeh / Tarek Belghith
 2014–2015 : Ounais Bouzidi
 2015–2016 : Karim Gabsi, Ridha Zammouri / 
 2016–2017 :  / Afouène Gharbi
 2017–2018 : Afouène Gharbi
 2018–2019 : Hatem Mednini /Abdelkarim Nafti

Presidents 

 M. Godal
 Amara Jarmoud
 Messaoud Ben Hmida
 Béchir Belhouchet
 Ahmed Cherif
 Letayef Koskossi
 Hédi Ben Romdhane
 Abbes Ben Hmidène

 Noureddine Hlioui
 Boubaker Telmoudi
 Taoufik Mzah
 Ahmed Ben Hmida
 Slaheddine Ben Hmida
 Mohamed Ouni
 Ali Maaref
 Moncef Kaddour

 Tahar Naïri
 Ali Ksiksi
 Khaled Bouchenak
 Mohamed Chakri
 Béchir Ben Amor
 Mongi Ksiksi
 Dakhli Belghith
 Hédi Gasmi

 Boulbaba Naïri
 Jalel Ben Hamida
 Fethi Ksiksi (2009–2011)
 Amor Cheniter (2011–2013)
 Samir Hamroun (2013–2015)
 Afif Ben Yamna (2015)
 Mohamed Saïdi (2015– )

References

 
Football clubs in Tunisia
Association football clubs established in 1954
1954 establishments in Tunisia